Entin is a surname. Notable people with the surname include:

Edmund Entin (born 1985), American actor
Ora Entin-Wohlman (born 1943), Israeli physicist
Yuri Entin (born 1935), Soviet Russian poet, playwright, and lyricist

See also
Enting